Carlo Senoner (born 24 October 1943) is a retired Italian alpine skier who won the slalom event at the 1966 World Championships. He competed in slalom events at the 1960 and 1968 Winter Olympics with the best result of 13th place in 1960. His father Tobia and sister Inge were also Olympic alpine skiers.

Biography
Carlo finished sixth in the slalom and fourth in the Alpine Combined at the FIS Alpine Skiing World Championships 1962. In the 1966 World Championshipes he finished 20th in the downhill race. In the slalom he was fourth in the first leg clocked in 53.72 seconds (2.39 seconds behind leading Bengt-Erik Grahn). In the second leg he was second clocked in 47.84 seconds but only 0.14 seconds behind Louis Jauffret, the eighth of the first run, and therefore it was enough to win – he was the first starter of the race and now he was the first after the race. At that time the procedure of a second leg was different to that of now-time. Not the 30th (or the 15th) clocked racer started the second leg but the racer with bib no 15 (or – if no 15 was out in the first run – that one who was next). Because Swedish racer Grahn had the no. 2 he was the last racer before Mr. Senoner. But Grahn didn't finish – when Carlo started, Guy Périllat was leading; Périllat was the second of the first leg (0.58 seconds ahead of Senoner – in the second leg Périllat was clocked in 49.11 seconds, place 11), but Senoner could achieve 47.84 seconds, so he won with a margin of 0.69 seconds.

References

External links
 

1943 births
Living people
People from Sëlva
Italian male alpine skiers
Alpine skiers at the 1960 Winter Olympics
Alpine skiers at the 1968 Winter Olympics
Olympic alpine skiers of Italy
Sportspeople from Südtirol